The St. Mary of Blachernae Church is a Byzantine church in Berat, Albania. It is named after the famous Church of St. Mary of Blachernae, near the Palace of Blachernae in Constantinople. It is believed that the church was built on the foundations of a ruined 5th century church that existed at the same place. The church is regarded as one of Berat's most important historical and architectural monuments and is a key tourist attraction for both Berat and Albania. 

The church dates mainly from the 13th century and contains impressive frescoes and icons on its interior walls and ground from the 16th century. The paintings that dates from the 16th century were mostly produced by Nicholas Onufri, the son of the more famous Onufri. 

The church has a rectangular narthex.

See also 
 Tourist attractions in Berat
 Culture of Albania
 Architecture of Albania
 Byzantine churches in Albania

References 

 
  
 

13th-century Eastern Orthodox church buildings
Cultural Monuments of Albania
Churches in Berat
Tourist attractions in Berat
Byzantine church buildings in Albania
Eastern Orthodox church buildings in Albania